The following contains a list of games within the 1956-57 season.

Final standings

ACC tournament
See 1957 ACC men's basketball tournament

NCAA tournament

Round of 23
North Carolina 90, Yale 74

Regional semi-finals
North Carolina    87, Canisius     75

Regional final
North Carolina    67, Syracuse     58

National semi-finals
North Carolina    74, Michigan St 70  (3ot)

National championship
North Carolina    54, Kansas       53  (3ot)

ACC's NCAA record
6–0

NIT
League rules prevented ACC teams from playing in the NIT, 1954–1966